Mohit Jangra (born 27 September 1999) is an Indian cricketer. He made his Twenty20 debut for Uttar Pradesh in the 2018–19 Syed Mushtaq Ali Trophy on 2 March 2019. He made his List A debut on 7 October 2019, for Uttar Pradesh in the 2019–20 Vijay Hazare Trophy. He made his first-class debut on 17 December 2019, for Uttar Pradesh in the 2019–20 Ranji Trophy.

References

External links
 

1999 births
Living people
Indian cricketers
Uttar Pradesh cricketers
Place of birth missing (living people)